Khaw is a sub-district located in Yarim District, Ibb Governorate, Yemen. Khaw had a population of 5324 as of  2004.

References 

Sub-districts in Yarim District